is an autobahn in Germany.

The A 623 is a spur connecting the A 8 to Saarbrücken. As with the A 1 to the west, the A 623 does not enter the inner city. Connections to arteries into Saarbrücken are made at the final two junctions. Junction 7 offers a connection to the Camphauser Straße expressway, which leads to the B 268 and the B 51. The road also continues past junction 8 into Saarbrücken, but as the B 41. The section of B 41 immediately after junction 8, about 1.2 km, is a short Kraftfahrstrasse (expressway).

The entirety of the A 623 was once part of the B 41. When the road was designated as an autobahn, the B 41 designation remained. The concurrency is indicated on  all distance signs along the A 623, a rarity for German roads. The concurrency continues a further three junctions to the east along the A 8.

There is no junction 6 along the A 623. This was to be the connection point with a proposed alignment of the A 1 into Saarbrücken. The planned route of the A 1 would have diverged from a location near that road's present-day junction 148 (Saarbrücken-Von der Heydt), then connecting with the A 623, continuing down the Camphauser Straße expressway, through Saarbrücken, and across the Westspange bridge to end at the A 620. For the same reason, the A 1 has no junction 149.

Exit list



 
Road continues as the B 41 into Saarbrücken
|}

References

External links
 Autobahn Atlas: A623


623